Whakawhiti Saddle is a low, broad snow saddle between Oliver Glacier and the lower portion of Robb Glacier, close east of Taylor Hills. Traversed by the southern party of the New Zealand Geological Survey Antarctic Expedition (NZGSAE) (1959–60) and so named because Whakawhiti is a Maori word meaning "crossing over."

References

Mountain passes of the Ross Dependency
Shackleton Coast